Thermophymatospora is a monotypic fungal genus in the family Polyporaceae containing the single species Thermophymatospora fibuligera, a basidiomycetous hyphomycete. Both the genus and species were described as new in 1986. The fungus was originally isolated from cultivated soil at a date palm plantation in Iraq. It has conidia that are brown, spherical, and relatively large (typically 20–24 μm). Its hyphae has clamp connections.

The specific epithet fibuligera, from the Latin for "clamp-bearing", refers to the characteristic presence of clamp connections in the hyphae.

References

Taxa described in 1986
Fungi of Western Asia
Polyporaceae
Monotypic Polyporales genera